Comeback Season is the second mixtape from Canadian rapper Drake. It was released on September 1, 2007.

Background
In 2007, Comeback Season spawned a single and a music video for "Replacement Girl", featuring Trey Songz, that was executive produced by Terral "T. Slack" of BPE. Also in 2007, Drake became the first unsigned Canadian rapper to have his music video featured on BET when his first single, "Replacement Girl", was featured as the "New Joint of the Day" on April 30, 2007.

Track listing
All songs are written by Drake.

Sample credits
 "The Presentation" samples "Comeback" performed by Donell Jones.
 "Comeback Season" samples "Failure" performed by Lupe Fiasco.
 "Closer" samples "Closer" performed by Goapele.
 "Barry Bonds" samples "Barry Bonds" performed by Kanye West.
 "Going in for Life" samples "Intimate Friends" performed by Eddie Kendricks.
 "Where to Now" samples "Time: The Donut of the Heart" performed by J Dilla.
 "Must Hate Money" samples "Supafly" performed by 334 Mob featuring Rich Boy.
 "Asthma Team" samples "Mr. Slow Flow" performed by Evidence.
 "Underdog" samples "Certified" performed by Glasses Malone.
 "Think Good Thoughts" samples "Sweet Love" performed by Anita Baker.
 "Teach U A Lesson" samples "Teach U A Lesson" performed by Robin Thicke.
 "Missin' You" samples "Missin' You" performed by Trey Songz.
 "Man of the Year" samples "Man of the Year" performed by Brisco and Flo Rida featuring Lil Wayne.

References

Drake (musician) albums
2007 mixtape albums
Albums produced by Boi-1da
Albums produced by Nottz
Albums produced by 9th Wonder